William Wallace Reid Jr. (June 18, 1917 – February 28, 1990) was an American actor. The son of actors Dorothy Davenport and Wallace Reid Sr., he appeared in ten films between 1920 and 1943, later becoming an architect.  Reid was born in Los Angeles, California 1917.  At the age of 72, he died in nearby Santa Monica Bay when his home-built Rutan Long-EZ airplane crashed into the water during heavy fog.

References

External links

1917 births
1990 deaths
American male silent film actors
20th-century American male actors
Male actors from Los Angeles
Aviators killed in aviation accidents or incidents in the United States